David Hayden may refer to:

 David Hayden (RAF airman) (born 1979), Royal Air Force regiment gunner
 David Hayden (priest) (born 1947), American priest
 David E. Hayden (1897–1974), American naval officer

See also
 David Haden, a character in Law & Order: Special Victims Unit